Aswathy is a 1974 Indian Malayalam film, directed by Jesey and produced by D. P. Nair. The film stars Prem Nazir, Sheela, Adoor Bhasi and Manavalan Joseph in the lead roles. The film has musical score by V. Dakshinamoorthy.

Cast
Prem Nazir
Sheela
Adoor Bhasi
Manavalan Joseph
Mohan Sharma
Sankaradi
Bahadoor
K. P. Ummer
Kuthiravattam Pappu
Ushanandini

Soundtrack
The music was composed by V. Dakshinamoorthy and the lyrics were written by P. Bhaskaran.

References

External links
 

1974 films
1970s Malayalam-language films